Carlos Alberto Rodriguez Sanchez (born 6 June 1996) is a Mexican football player.

Career
Rodriguez was with the CESIFUT Academy until 19 years-old, also spending time on loan with Pachuca's under-17 squad. He signed with United Soccer League side Sacramento Republic on 2 March 2016.

References

1996 births
Living people
Footballers from Coahuila
Mexican footballers
Sacramento Republic FC players
Association football defenders
USL Championship players